The Eight Arch Bridge on the Stackpole Estate is a grade II* listed construction, in Pembrokeshire, Wales.   It is owned and maintained by the National Trust.

History
The bridge was built in 1797 to connect Stackpole Court and Home Farm to Stackpole Quay and the New Deer Park.

At some point face-to-face iron ties were added to hold the bridge together.

On 2 August 1996 it was listed by Heritage in Wales (now Cadw) as grade II* for its eyecatching nature as a major feature of Stackpole Park, and as part of the Stackpole group of buildings.

Description
The bridge is built over a weir between two ponds (part of the Bosherston Lily Ponds).  There are eight segmental arches in limestone, one with slightly projecting keystones.  The arch rings are in ashlars; the rest of the arches in common stonework.  There are a low rebuilt parapet walls, with slight wing walls at each end, on either side of the  roadway.

References

Grade II* listed bridges in Wales
Grade II* listed buildings in Pembrokeshire
Bridges completed in 1797
Stone bridges in the United Kingdom
Bridges in Pembrokeshire